City on the Make may refer to:
An episode in the fourth season of Ozark (TV series)
Chicago: City on the Make